The 2022 Race to Stop Suicide 200 was an ARCA Menards Series East race that was held on February 15, 2022. It was contested over 200 laps on the  short track. It was the first race of the 2022 ARCA Menards Series East season. Kyle Busch Motorsports driver Sammy Smith, the reigning champion, collected his first win of the season.

Background

Entry list 

 (R) denotes rookie driver.
 (i) denotes driver who is ineligible for series driver points.

Practice/Qualifying 
Practice and qualifying were both combined into one 90-minute session, with a driver's fastest time counting as their qualifying lap.

Race results

References 

Race to Stop Suicide 200
Race to Stop Suicide 200
2022 ARCA Menards Series East